Kunming Changshui International Airport  is the primary airport serving Kunming, the capital of Yunnan Province, China. The airport opened at 08:00 (UTC+8) on 28 June 2012, replacing the old Kunming Wujiaba International Airport, which was later demolished. As a gateway to Southeast and South Asia, Changshui Airport is a hub for China Eastern Airlines, Kunming Airlines, Lucky Air, Sichuan Airlines and Ruili Airlines.

The new airport has two runways (versus the single runway at Wujiaba), and handled 48,075,978 passengers in 2019, making it one of the 50 busiest airports in the world by passenger traffic, the first time it earned this distinction. In 2020, it is expected to handle 50 million passengers.

The main terminal was designed by architectural firm SOM with engineering firm Arup.

History
Construction began in 2009. At the time, the facility was reported to be named the Zheng He International Airport, named after Zheng He, a Chinese mariner, explorer, and diplomat. The very short construction time was marred by two separate incidents. The first occurred on January 3, 2010, when seven construction workers died as an incomplete overpass collapsed. On June 28, 2011, 11 workers were injured when a tunnel that was under construction collapsed. Construction of the airport's main terminal was completed by July 2011.

Facilities

Terminal
The main  terminal of Changshui International Airport is the second largest terminal building in China. The terminal has 66 gates with jet bridges. Total number of 88 gates are available.

Runways
Kunming Changshui International Airport now has two runways.

A-CDM
In July 2014, Kunming airport signed an agreement with the aviation data service company VariFlight regarding the Airport Collaborative Decision Making system (A-CDM) installation in order to improve the efficiency of its operations, reduce fuel consumption and other expenses. Kunming airport became the first aviation hub in China to implement such an information system. In 2017, the airport's on-time performance reached 85.3%.

Airlines and destinations

Passenger

Cargo

Ground transportation

Road
The airport is also connected to Kunming by a 13 km toll highway, as well as Provincial Road S101.

Metro
The airport is the terminus of Line 6 of the Kunming Metro, which opened on the same day as the airport.

Bus
There are also several shuttle bus services available from the city centre.

Statistics

See also
List of airports in China
List of the busiest airports in China

References

External links
 Official website (Chinese)
 The Fourth Air Hub in China—Kunming International New Airport

Airports in Yunnan
Airports established in 2012
2012 establishments in China
Transport in Kunming